Alpendorf (German for alpine village) is a village and a part of the town St. Johann im Pongau.

The economy is largely dependent on tourism, particularly during the winter months when thousands of predominantly German, Danish and Dutch skiers visiting the village. The resort is popular with members of the British and American forces based in Germany. There are also a significant number of English and Welsh schools visiting the area.

Accommodation
The resort is largely made up of four- and five-star hotels with wellness areas and restaurants. More reasonably priced accommodation can be found in St Johann, where hotels run a free shuttle bus. There is also a free ski shuttle bus that runs throughout the season from St Johann to Alpendorf.

Skiing 
Alpendorf serves as one of the gateways to the Salzburger Sportwelt, one of the five alliances that make up Ski Amadé, a network of resorts with over 870 slopes and 270 modern ski lifts.

The resort, as a result of its location in the Eastern Alps, has a good record for winter snow. There are lakes containing  of fresh water, which is used by the snow cannon that cover 95% of the slopes.

Resort statistics
Altitude 850 m - 2188 m
Length of ski trails: 350 km
Cross-country trails: 220 km
Snow cannons: 150
Mountain restaurants: 80

Lift statistics
Button lifts: 1
T-Bars: 2
Chair lifts (4 to 8 seater): 35
Gondola lifts (6 to 16 seated and standing): 12
Aerial cable car: 1
People movements: 56,000 an hour

Slope statistics
Blue Slopes (least challenging): 119 km
Red Slopes (intermediate): 189 km
Black Slopes (difficult):  42 km

Famous residents
Hermann Maier (nearby village of Flachau)
Ralf Schumacher

External links
St Johann/Alpendorf Tourist Office

Cities and towns in St. Johann im Pongau District